Alvin Ray Bush (June 4, 1893 – November 5, 1959) was a Republican member of the U.S. House of Representatives from Pennsylvania.

Biography
Alvin Bush was born on a farm in Boggs Township, Clearfield County, Pennsylvania.  At the age of thirteen started work as a laborer in Pennsylvania coal mines and later was an apprentice in a machine shop.  During World War I, Bush served overseas as a corporal with the Five Hundred and Forty-first Motor Truck Company.  He established an automobile repair business in Philipsburg, Pennsylvania.  Bush purchased a bus line serving Philipsburg and neighboring communities, and later becoming president and general manager of the Williamsport Transportation Co.   He operated a dairy farm in Lycoming County, Pennsylvania, and served as director of Lowry Electric Co. and Muncy Valley Hospital.

Bush was elected as a Republican to the 82nd United States Congress and to the four succeeding Congresses and served from January 3, 1951, until his death in Williamsport, Pennsylvania in 1959. Bush voted in favor of the Civil Rights Act of 1957.

Namesake
The Alvin R. Bush Dam on Kettle Creek, north of Renovo, Pennsylvania, is named in his honor.

See also
 List of United States Congress members who died in office (1950–99)

References

External links
 Retrieved on 2009-03-01
The Political Graveyard

1893 births
1959 deaths
American military personnel of World War I
Republican Party members of the United States House of Representatives from Pennsylvania
20th-century American politicians
Businesspeople from Pennsylvania
20th-century American businesspeople